eBella was a South African Digital satellite television channel created and owned by e.tv's  eMedia Investment for Openview and DStv.

History
After eMedia Investments and Platco Digital successfully launched its OpenView platform, they decided to expand their family of channels. With eExtra in particular being popular in airing telenovelas such as Santa Diabla, e.tv decided to bulk in on international dramas and series.

The launch was also because of a new local content channel on DStv called Moja Love, launched on the 14th of February 2015. The channel was centered to love and relationship seekers, to which e.tv created eBella to be a female-skewed channel.

eBella was terminated at the end of March 2019 due to low viewership. All content was moved to eExtra.

Programming 
eBella shows a number of local and international series, movies, dramas, and telenovelas.

 Meri Aashiqui Tum Se Hi
 Madhubala – Ek Ishq Ek Junoon
 Covert Affairs
 Kasilicious
 Exploring the Vine
 Married in 7 Days
 Mahadi-Lobola
 Naagin (2015 TV series)
 Films and Stars
 Joia Rara
 Itna Karo Na Mujhe Pyaar
 Charlie's Cake Angels
 Nirmala's Spice World
 The Girl named Feriha
 Black Money Love
 Instaglamour
 Bin Kuch Kahe
 Santa Diabla
 Caribbean Flower
 La impostora
 Tierra de reyes
 A-List Listings
 Fashion Forward
 My Name is Sarah
 Princess (TV series)

References 

Direct broadcast satellite services
Television companies of South Africa
Television channels and stations established in 2018
Television channels and stations disestablished in 2019